Charles Edward Napier (8 October 1910 – 5 September 1973) was a Scottish footballer who played for Celtic (winning the Scottish Cup in 1931 and 1933), Derby County, Sheffield Wednesday, Falkirk (unofficial wartime competitions only) and Stenhousemuir, and for the Scotland national team and the Scottish League XI.

References

Sources

External links

The Celtic Wiki profile

1910 births
1973 deaths
Scottish footballers
Scotland international footballers
Celtic F.C. players
Derby County F.C. players
Sheffield Wednesday F.C. players
Stenhousemuir F.C. players
Falkirk F.C. wartime guest players
Footballers from Falkirk (council area)
Scottish Football League players
Scottish Junior Football Association players
Scottish Football League representative players
Maryhill Hibernians F.C. players
English Football League players
Association football inside forwards
Luton Town F.C. non-playing staff
Scotland wartime international footballers
Alva Albion Rangers F.C. players